Pranas Mažeika (1917 in Beloretsk, Bashkortostan – 2007 in USA) was a Lithuanian basketball player. He won two gold medals with the Lithuania national basketball team during EuroBasket 1937 and EuroBasket 1939.

References

Further reading
 Vidas Mačiulis, Vytautas Gudelis. Halė, kurioje žaidė Lubinas ir Sabonis. 1939–1989 – Respublikinis sporto kombinatas, Kaunas, 1989

1917 births
2007 deaths
FIBA EuroBasket-winning players
Lithuanian men's basketball players
Sportspeople from Kaunas
Lithuanian emigrants to the United States